Every Little Thing may refer to:

Every Little Thing (band), a Japanese pop duo debuting in 1996
Every Little Thing, a documentary podcast started by Gimlet Media in 2017
Every Little Thing (album), 2017 album by Carly Pearce

Songs
"Ev'ry Little Thing", song by Pat Boone on the album Howdy! 1957
"Every Little Thing" (Beatles song), 1964
"Every Little Thing" (Jeff Lynne song), 1990
"Every Little Thing" (Kate Ceberano song), 1991
"Every Little Thing" (Carlene Carter song), 1993
"Every Little Thing" (Margaret Ulrich song) 1995
"Every Little Thing" (Delirious? song), 2003
"Every Little Thing" (Eric Clapton song), 2013
"Every Little Thing", song by Röyksopp and Robyn on the EP Do It Again 2014
"Every Little Thing" (Carly Pearce song), 2017
"Every Little Thing" (Russell Dickerson song), 2018

See also
"Every Little Thing I Do", a 1959 song by Dion & The Belmonts
"Every Little Thing She Does Is Magic", a 1981 song by The Police
"Every Little Thing I Do", a 1995 song by Soul 4 Real
"Every Little Thing You Do", a 2000 song by Westlife from Coast to Coast